The Principality of Freedonia was a micronation based on libertarian principles. It was created as a "hypothetical project" by a group of teenagers in the United States in 1992. The project was formalized as a new country project in 1997, which included attempts in 2001 to lease territory in Somaliland. The attempt to lease land was rejected.

It was headed by a Texas university student named John Kyle, who used the title Prince John. The Principality of Freedonia itself was based in Boston, Massachusetts.

Coinage
While the Freedonia project was active, it minted its own currency. It had a number of 50 Freedonian dollar 1 oz silver coins minted. It offered these coins for sale on the organization's website.

Current status
The Freedonia project's website has not been updated for a number of years and its discussion forum no longer functions, e-mail communication with the self-styled Prince does not work, and the entire project appears to be defunct. E-mail statements from the founder indicate that the project is not being actively pursued as of 2004.

As of 2013, the Freedonia website is no longer available.

See also 
 List of micronations

References

Further reading
 Micronations. pp. 56-59.
 "The invisible empires". The Sunday Leader. (scroll down on page)
 "Houston 101: Hail, Freedonia (Except For The Part About The Killings)". Houston Press.

External links 
 Official website (archived)

Micronations in the United States
States and territories established in 1997
Former principalities
Micronations